Government Nizamia Tibbi College is a unani medicine college located in Hyderabad, Telangana, India.

History
The college has history dating back to 1810. It was started by an Afghan scholar, Sajida Begum Masjid.

The College
Government Nizamia Tibbi College is located at Charminar, Hyderabad, 500002, Telangana, India. The college is affiliated to KNR University of Health Sciences, Telangana, India.

Programmes
The Main Undergraduate course offered at the college is BUMS (Bachelor of Unani Medicine and Surgery) course. In addition the college also offers Postgraduate (MD) course.

See also 
Education in India
Literacy in India
List of institutions of higher education in Telangana

References

External links
 Images of preparation of Unani drugs at Hospital

Medical colleges in Telangana
Unani medicine organisations
Educational institutions established in 1810
1810 establishments in India